The Mumbai Regional Congress Committee (MRCC) is the unit of the Indian National Congress for the city of Mumbai. Although Mumbai is part of Maharashtra state, the Mumbai RCC functions as an independent Pradesh Congress Committee unit. The current President of the Mumbai Regional Congress Committee is Bhai Jagtap

Office Bearers

President

 Bhai Jagtap

Working President

 Charan Singh Sapra

Chairperson & Senior Vice President 
 Baba Siddique

Mumbai Youth Congress President

Zeeshan Siddique

Mumbai NSUI President

Mr.Pradyum Yadav

NSUI RTI Dept.

 Er. Sandeep Maurya, National Convenor NSUI RTI Dept. and In-charge Mumbai University

Mumbai AIUWC  President

 Janardan Singh

Mumbai Regional Congress Committee, Minority Dept 

 Babbu Khan, chairman.
 Rafat Asad Khan, Secretary.

References

External links
 Official Mumbai Regional Congress Committee website
 Official Indian National Congress website
 Maharashtra Pradesh Congress Committee

Politics of Mumbai
Indian National Congress of Maharashtra